Shigenobu Shima (嶋 重宣, born June 16, 1976 in Kamifukuoka, Saitama, Japan) is a former Nippon Professional Baseball outfielder.

External links

1976 births
Living people
Baseball people from Saitama Prefecture
Japanese baseball players
Nippon Professional Baseball outfielders
Hiroshima Toyo Carp players
Saitama Seibu Lions players
Japanese baseball coaches
Nippon Professional Baseball coaches